Gienow is a German surname.

People 
 Dale Gienow, Canadian Animal trainer
 Hanna Gienow (born 1943), German politician (CDU)
 Jessica C. E. Gienow-Hecht (born 1964), Author
 Peter Gienow (born 1960), German homeopath and author

Other Uses 

Gienow Windows & Doors Canadian manufacturer of windows and doors

German-language surnames